Chayka is a rural locality (a settlement) in Rubtsovsky Selsoviet, Rubtsovsky District, Altai Krai, Russia. The population was 17 in 2013. There is one street.

Geography 
Chayka is located 6 km south of Rubtsovsk (the district's administrative centre) by road. Rubtsovsk is the nearest rural locality.

References 

Rural localities in Rubtsovsky District